Florentino Armas Lerena (born 1900 in San Millán de la Cogolla) was a Spanish clergyman and prelate for the Roman Catholic Territorial Prelature of Chota. He was appointed bishop in 1963. He died in 1979.

References 

1900 births
1979 deaths
Spanish Roman Catholic bishops